John Alexander MacDonell (November 22, 1854 – October 27, 1912) was a Canadian politician.

Born in Dundas, Canada West, MacDonell was educated in Hamilton and Toronto. A civil engineer and contractor, he was Chief Clerk of the Manitoba Department of Public Works and Chief Engineer of Manitoba. At one time, he also was editor and owner of the Manitou Mercury; MacDonell also took part in the survey and construction of the Canadian Pacific Railway. A former member of the Dufferin Municipal Council, he was elected to the Legislative Assembly of Manitoba in 1886 as Liberal candidate for the riding of Lorne. He was defeated in 1888.

In 1896, he was elected to the House of Commons of Canada for the electoral district of Selkirk. A Liberal, he did not run in 1900 because of ill health.

He died in Kingston, Ontario in 1912.

References
 Manitoba Historical Society: John Alexander MacDonell
 

1854 births
1912 deaths
Liberal Party of Canada MPs
Manitoba Liberal Party MLAs
Members of the House of Commons of Canada from Manitoba
People from Dundas, Ontario